A dam is a water reservoir in the ground, confined by a barrier, embankment or excavation, on a pastoral property or similar. The term is found widely in South African, Australian and New Zealand English, and several other English dialects, such as that of Yorkshire. 

The term can be found in the old English folk song Three Jolly Rogues: 

The expression "farm dam" has this meaning unambiguously, and where the barrier or embankment is intended, it may be referred to as the "dam wall".

Usage examples
Examples from Australia:

An example from New Zealand:

References 

Australian English
New Zealand English
Reservoirs
Dams by type
Water supply infrastructure
Agricultural buildings